The Women's tournament of volleyball at the 2017 Bolivarian Games in Santa Marta, Colombia, was held between November 12 and November 16. All games were played at the Coliseo Municipal. The Dominican Republic won the tournament, Peru and Colombia followed.

Teams

Pool standing procedure
 Match points
 Sets ratio
 Points ratio
 Result of the last match between the tied teams

Match won 3–0 or 3–1: 3 match points for the winner, 0 match points for the loser
Match won 3–2: 2 match points for the winner, 1 match point for the loser

Round-Robin

Match results

Final standings

References

2017 Bolivarian Games
Bolivarian Games